Nikolo Kotzev (born 6 June 1961) is a Bulgarian guitarist, violinist, songwriter and producer, perhaps most famous for his 2001 rock opera Nostradamus and his band Brazen Abbot.

Biography 
Kotzev was born in Pazardzhik and started taking violin lessons at the age of five. While in his teens he took an interest to rock music, and started playing the guitar.

Nikolo worked as a session musician and played the guitar in a Bulgarian rock group Impulse. While touring with the band in Europe in the late 80s, Nikolo met Swedish singer Björn Lodin. When Nikolo relocated to Mariehamn, Åland, Finland in 1989, he joined Lodin's band Baltimoore, with whom he recorded two albums: Double Density (1992) and Thought For Food (1994).

Creative differences led to Kotzev's departure in 1994, at which point Nikolo started working on a solo project under the Brazen Abbot moniker. The result was Live and Learn (1995), which featured singers Göran Edman (ex-Yngwie Malmsteen), Glenn Hughes (ex-Deep Purple, ex-Trapeze) and Thomas Vikström, keyboard player Mic Michaeli (Europe), bassist Svante Henryson and drummer Ian Haugland (Europe). Kotzev played the guitar, produced, mixed and wrote all the songs for the album.
The follow-up album, Eye of the Storm (1996), featured mostly the same people, with Joe Lynn Turner (formerly of Rainbow and Deep Purple) replacing Hughes and John Levén (Europe) replacing Henryson. The same line-up also released Bad Religion (1997).

Brazen Abbot was put on hiatus when Kotzev started working on a rock opera about Nostradamus. Due to a string of setbacks, including scheduling conflicts and Kotzev's record company, USG Records, going bankrupt, the album wasn't completed until 2000 and was finally released as Nikolo Kotzev's Nostradamus in 2001 on SPV Records. The album featured most Brazen Abbot members, in addition to singers Jørn Lande (Masterplan), Alannah Myles and Sass Jordan. Fifteen years later, it premiered at the State Opera of city of Ruse, Bulgaria, for the 450th anniversary of Nostradamus's death.

Kotzev resumed work with Brazen Abbot in 2002, releasing Guilty as Sin in 2003. The line-up was mostly the same as for Bad Religion, with Lande replacing Vikström.
Michaeli, Levén and Haugland departed Brazen Abbot to rejoin Europe. Temporary replacements filled in during a short tour in Bulgaria, recordings of which were released on the live album A Decade of Brazen Abbot (2004).
My Resurrection followed in 2005, and featured four singers: Edman, Turner and new members Tony Harnell (TNT) and Erik Mårtensson and a new backing band consisting of bassist Wayne Banks (ex-Sabbat, Blaze), organist Nelko Kolarov and drummer Mattias Knutas.

In addition to being a recording artist, Kotzev has also produced and mixed albums by other bands, such as Saxon, Molly Hatchet, Rose Tattoo and Messiah's Kiss.

In 2011 Kotzev started a band in Sofia, Bulgaria, named Kikimora, which plays hard rock with Bulgarian lyrics.

He received criticism from his former colleague Joe Lynn Turner in 2015 when he released a twentieth-anniversary compilation CD/DVD of Live And Learn material, which Turner condemned as a 'homemade bootleg.'

Discography 
 Baltimoore - Double Density (1992)
 Baltimoore - Thought For Food (1994)
 Brazen Abbot - Live and Learn (1995)
 Brazen Abbot - Eye of the Storm (1996)
 Brazen Abbot - Bad Religion (1997)
 Nikolo Kotzev - Nostradamus (2001)
 Brazen Abbot - Guilty as Sin (2003)
 Brazen Abbot - A Decade of Brazen Abbot (2004)
 Brazen Abbot - My Resurrection (2005)

References

External links 
 
 Official Brazen Abbot website
 Official Nikolo Kotzev's Nostradamus website
 Nitrax Productions, Kotzev's Production Company's website
 Nikolo Kotzev's Draconia - the rock opera
 Brazen Abbot Argentina Fansite
 Nikolo Kotzev at Bulgarian Rock Archives

1961 births
Living people
People from Pazardzhik
Bulgarian rock guitarists
Bulgarian expatriates in Finland
Bulgarian record producers
Brazen Abbot members
Baltimoore members